William Bowen may refer to:

 William Bowen (actor) (1666–1718), British stage actor
 William Bowen (rugby union) (1862–1925), rugby union footballer of the 1880s, and 1890s for Wales, and Swansea
 William J. Bowen (1868–1948), American labor union leader
 William Bowen (author) (1877–1937), children's author and Newbery Honor recipient
 William Bowen (British Army officer) (1898–1961), British Army general
 William G. Bowen (1933–2016), former president of Princeton University
 Billy Bowen (1897–1960), rugby union and rugby league footballer of the 1920s for Wales (RU), Swansea, and Leeds (RL)
 Bill Bowen (1929–1999), African-american politician in Ohio
 William Miller Bowen (1862–1937), civic leader in Los Angeles, California

See also